Kevin Barrett (born 6 July 1980) and attended Stonyhurst College. He was a rugby union player for Exeter Chiefs in the Aviva Premiership. He plays as a scrum-half. On 22 March 2011, Barrett announced his resignation from the Exeter Chiefs for the 2011/2012 season. He was previously with fellow Aviva Premiership side Saracens.

On 3 May 2013, Barrett announced he will be retiring from rugby and will be rejoining former club Saracens as a member of the clubs strength and conditioning team.

References

External links
Exeter Chiefs profile

1980 births
Living people
Ampthill RUFC players
Commonwealth Games rugby sevens players of England
English rugby union players
Rugby sevens players at the 2010 Commonwealth Games
Rugby union players from Cuckfield
Saracens F.C. players